Derek James Dixie is an American musician, record producer, and musical director best known for his work with Beyoncé, Chloe x Halle, and The Carters. He has five Grammy nominations and one Emmy nomination.

Early life and education 
Dixie grew up in Youngstown, Ohio. He attended Youngstown State University and graduated from The Recording Workshop in Chillicothe, Ohio. Afterwards he taught audio engineering at The Recording Workshop.

Career

MTV’s Making His Band with Sean “Diddy” Combs 
In 2009, Dixie was one of 42 finalists in the MTV show "Making His Band," about Sean "Diddy" Combs’ search for a band to play on his upcoming album, "Last Dance in Paris."

Superbowl 
Dixie was the music director for Beyoncé’s solo Superbowl half time show performance in 2013 and again in 2016 when she co-headlined with Coldplay and Bruno Mars.

In 2019, Dixie arranged and orchestrated a performance by Chloe x Halle for Superbowl LIII with 30 Youngstown State University musicians and a Los Angeles horn and string ensemble.

Beyoncé 
After almost ten years of working with Beyoncé as Music Director, Dixie received an Emmy nomination for Outstanding Music Direction for “HOMECOMING: A Film by Beyoncé.”

Dixie worked with Beyoncé to create Black Parade, an anthemic song for her to sing about her heritage, hometown and African roots, reflecting on the Black Experience in America and release on Juneteenth.

Songwriting, instrument, arrangement, and production credits

Film & documentary scoring

Awards 
Dixie has five Grammy nominations and one Emmy nomination.

Grammy Awards

References

External links
 

20th-century American male musicians
20th-century American musicians
21st-century American male musicians
African-American record producers
African-American songwriters
American hip hop record producers
Beyoncé
Living people
Year of birth missing (living people)